Dan Jambor (born 23 November 1999) is a Czech footballer who currently plays as a midfielder for MFK Vyškov.

Club career

FC Zbrojovka Brno
He made his professional debut for Zbrojovka Brno in the home match against Jihlava on 22 July 2018, which ended in a loss 1:3. On 22 August 2018 he scored his first goal for Zbrojovka in a second round of Czech Cup against Žďár nad Sázavou

References

External links
 Profile at FC Zbrojovka Brno official site
 Profile at FAČR official site
 

1999 births
Living people
Czech footballers
FC Zbrojovka Brno players
SK Líšeň players
MFK Vyškov players
Czech National Football League players
Moravian-Silesian Football League players
Association football midfielders
Footballers from Brno